Josep Maria Fradera Barceló (born 1952) is a Spanish historian, professor of Contemporary History at the Pompeu Fabra University. Specialised in the colonial system of the late Spanish Empire, he has also studied the history of Catalonia.

Biography 
Born in Mataró in 1952. An anti-francoist activist in his youth and member of the Unified Socialist Party of Catalonia (PSUC), Fradera began his college studies at the Autonomous University of Barcelona (UAB) in 1971. He earned a PhD from the UAB in 1983, reading a dissertation titled Crisi colonial i mercat interior, 1814-1837. Les bases comercials de la indústria catalana moderna and supervised by Josep Fontana.

From 1987 to 1988, he worked as research assistant of John H. Elliott at the Institute for Advanced Study in Princeton.

He was appointed to a chair of Contemporary History at the Pompeu Fabra University (UPF) in 1996. He has been a visiting scholar at the University of Chicago and at the Harvard University's Center For European Studies. He is also a researcher for the Catalan Institution for Research and Advanced Studies (ICREA).

He writes in Spanish and Catalan language.

Works

References 
Citations

 Bibliography
 
 
 
 
 
 
 
 
 
 
 
 
 

1952 births
Living people
Autonomous University of Barcelona alumni
Academic staff of the Autonomous University of Barcelona
Academic staff of Pompeu Fabra University
Historians from Catalonia
Historians of colonialism
20th-century Spanish historians
21st-century Spanish historians